The 1924 Michigan State Normal Normalites football team was an American football team that represented Michigan State Normal College (later renamed Eastern Michigan University) as a member of the Michigan Intercollegiate Athletic Association (MIAA) during the 1924 college football season.  In their second and final season under head coach James M. Brown, the Normalites compiled a 2–5–1 record and were outscored by a total of 69 to 46. Elwood A. Watson was the team captain.

Schedule

References

Michigan State Normal
Eastern Michigan Eagles football seasons
Michigan State Normal Normalites football